The 1990 1000 km of Suzuka was the fourth race of the 1990 All Japan Sports Prototype Car Endurance Championship. It was run on August 26, 1990.

Official results

Class winners in bold. Results are as follows:

Statistics
 Pole Position -  #37 TOM'S 90C-V - 1:49.674
 Fastest Lap - #37 TOM'S 90C-V - 1:56.352
 Winner's Race Time - 5:51:40.225

References

Suzuka